Arbasy Małe  is a settlement in the administrative district of Gmina Drohiczyn, within Siemiatycze County, Podlaskie Voivodeship, in north-eastern Poland.

The settlement has a population of 36.

References

Villages in Siemiatycze County